Anna Maria Bennett (ca. 1750 – 12 February 1808) was a Welsh novelist who wrote in English.  Some sources give her name as Agnes Maria Bennett. Her best-known work is the epistolary novel Agnes de-Courci (1789).

She worked as the housekeeper of Thomas Pye, and was also her employer's mistress. They had two illegitimate children, one of whom was the actress Harriet Pye Esten.

Family
Anna was probably born in Merthyr Tydfil Glamorgan, Wales, the daughter of a David Evans, who was described variously as a customs officer and a grocer. She married a Thomas Bennett, who was either a customs officer or a tanner, and moved to London with him. She soon left him and eventually found work in a chandler's shop. There she met Vice-Admiral Thomas Pye, who took her to his property in Tooting, Surrey, where she became his housekeeper and mistress.

She minc'd his meat, & made his bed
And warm'd it too, sometimes, 'tis said.'

The couple had at least two illegitimate children together, Thomas Pye Bennett and Harriet Pye Bennett. The latter became a famous actress as Harriet Pye Esten, with her mother tutoring her and helping to launch her career. The relationship ended with Pye's death in 1785, around the same time that Anna's first novel, Anna: Memoirs of a Welch Heiress, was published and became successful. Pye died he left his Suffolk Street town house to Bennett.

Her daughter, Harriet Pye Esten, initially appeared in Bath and Bristol before moving on to appear in Dublin. Whilst she was there in 1789 she and her mother negotiated a formal separation with James Esten. Bennett paid off her son-in-law's debts in exchange for his agreement. Her final work, Vicissitudes Abroad, was highly controversial. She died in Brighton.

Works
Anna: or Memoirs of a Welch Heiress, 1785
Juvenile Indiscretions, 1786
Agnes de-Courci: a Domestic Tale, 1789
Ellen, Countess of Castle Howel, 1794
The Beggar Girl and he Benefactors, 1797
De Valcourt, 1800
Vicissitudes Abroad, 1806

References

Sources

External links

Ian Johnstone, Author Biography
Online version of Agnes De-Courci

1750s births
1808 deaths
18th-century Welsh novelists
19th-century Welsh novelists
18th-century Welsh women writers
19th-century Welsh women writers
Welsh women novelists
People from Merthyr Tydfil
Welsh domestic workers